A. montana may refer to:

Acacia montana, mallee wattle, an Australian shrub
Acromantis montana, a praying mantis
Actinodaphne montana, a plant in the family Lauraceae
Agathis montana, the Mount Panié kauri, a species of conifer of the family Araucariaceae
Agyneta montana, a sheet weaver (spider)
Ambulyx montana, a moth of the family Sphingidae
Anastrangalia montana, a beetle
Annona montana, mountain soursop, a plant of the custard apple family
Anodonthyla montana, a frog of the family Microhylidae
Anthene montana, a butterfly in the family Lycaenidae
Anthyllis montana, mountain kidney vetch
Apatophysis montana, a beetle of the family Cerambycidae
Araucaria montana, a conifer
Arenaria montana, mountain sandwort
Argentulia montana, a moth
Arnica montana, Wolf's bane, or mountain tobacco